William Hole, MA (1710–1791) Vicar of Bishops Nympton was Archdeacon of Barnstaple from 16 March 1745 to 26 October 1791.

References

Archdeacons of Barnstaple
Alumni of Exeter College, Oxford
1710 births
1791 deaths